Jonai Girls' College, established in 1993, is a women's general degree college situated at Jonai, in Dhemaji district, Assam. This college is affiliated with the Dibrugarh University. This college offers bachelor's degree courses in arts.

References

Universities and colleges in Assam
Colleges affiliated to Dibrugarh University
Educational institutions established in 1993
1993 establishments in Assam